Maybeck High School is a coeducational, independent, college preparatory high school located in Berkeley, California.

History
Established in 1972, Maybeck High School is named after the regional architect Bernard Maybeck (1862–1957).  Bernard Maybeck's concern for the environment and his appreciation for disciplined technique inspired his use of local natural materials and craftsmanship within the existing landscape.  In his honor, Maybeck High School promotes traditional academic study as well as the exploration and appreciation of nature.

Admissions
Prospective students typically attend an Open House, visit classes, take a placement test, and then interview with Maybeck staff prior to admittance.

Curriculum
Maybeck offers an academically challenging college-preparatory curriculum in a collaborative rather than competitive environment. Maybeck students find creative, intelligent peers who are excited about learning.

Extracurricular Activities
Student extracurricular activities vary widely, typically with a strong emphasis on the outdoors, culture, and the arts, encompassing film and theatre production, biking and hiking trips, and outings to local museums and events. Teachers encourage and support student-led clubs, and the Student Activities Committee organizes creative extracurricular opportunities.

Special Programs

For two weeks before spring break, the school suspends regular classes and conducts Special Programs, in which students divide into small groups led by staff members, each pursuing its own activity. One group may go snowboarding in Tahoe or diving in the Philippines, while another group paints murals in the halls of the school or builds kites to fly at the Berkeley Marina. Programs vary from year to year; past offerings include trips to New Orleans, Machu Picchu, France, Egypt, and Vietnam, and seminars on subjects such as fencing, South Indian culture, and Broadway theater.

References

External links
 Maybeck High School Website
 Maybeck on KRON-TV's "Best of the Bay"

Education in Berkeley, California
High schools in Alameda County, California
Preparatory schools in California
Private high schools in California
Educational institutions established in 1972
1972 establishments in California